2012 was the fifth competitive season for the Cairns based Skill360 Northern Pride Rugby League Football Club. They competed in the QRL state competition, the Intrust Super Cup. 12 clubs competed, with each club playing 22 matches (11 home and 11 away) over 25 weeks (In 2012 the Central Comets were renamed the CQ Capras).

The Pride finished seventh, missing out on a finals appearance for the first time in their short history. At the end of the season, Head Coach David Maiden resigned, while fullback Chey Bird, who scored 572 points in 94 appearances for the Pride, retired along with former North Queensland Cowboys star Rod Jensen, who scored 36 tries in 69 games for the club, second on the Pride's all-time try scorer list.
Northern Pride 2012 ISC video highlights (7 videos).

2012 Season –  Skill360 Northern Pride

Staff
 Coach: David Maiden
 Assistant coach: David Westley
 Team captain: Ty Williams
 Club captain: Ben Laity
 Chief executive: Chris Sheppard
 Chairman: Bob Fowler

 Competition: Intrust Super Cup

Player awards
 Sea Swift Most improved player – Brent Oosen
 Sea Swift Photographers Choice Award – Scott Gibson
 Sea Swift Season Members Player of the Year – Alex Starmer
 Sea Swift Best Back – Brett Anderson
 Sea Swift Best Forward – Ben Spina
 Sea Swift Players' Player – Ben Spina
 Club Person of the Year – O’Kane/Wilson Family
 Skill360 Australia Northern Pride Player of the Year – Ben Spina
 QRL Carbine Club Rookie of the Year – Ethan Lowe

2012 player gains
  Ethan Lowe from Sydney Roosters
  Saia Makisi from Souths Logan Magpies
 Jamie Frizzo from retirement
 Joel Marama from Wests Panthers
 Maddie Oosen from CDRL Southern Suburbs
 Mitch Seri from TDRL Herbert River Crushers
 Justin Castellaro from TDRL Herbert River Crushers
 Scott Gibson from TDRL Herbert River Crushers

Player losses after 2011 season
  Mark Cantoni to Pia Donkeys, Elite One Championship, France
  Luke Harlen to North Queensland Cowboys 
  Sheldon Powe-Hobbs to Melbourne Storm 
  Aidan Day to Mackay Cutters 
  Lancen Joudo (released)
  Mick Wilson (released)

2012 Season Launch
 Tuesday 31 January 2012, Barlow Park.

Pre-Season Boot Camp

 Djarragun Farm in the Goldsborough Valley – Friday 16-Sunday 18 December 2011. 110 players and coaching staff from all three squads (Intrust Super Cup, Under-18 and Under-16) attended the boot camp. Video Highlights.

2012 Jerseys

Trial Matches

Intrust Super Cup matches

2012 Ladder

2012 Northern Pride players

North Queensland Cowboys who played for the Northern Pride in 2012

2012 Televised Games
In 2012 games were televised in Queensland and shown live at 2.00pm (AEST) on Sunday afternoons (except during coverage of the London Olympics) by Channel 9, WIN Television (RTQ) and in remote areas on Imparja Television. The commentary team was Andrew Voss, Ben Ikin and Nick Curry. The first home game broadcast from Barlow Park, Cairns was Round 13, Sunday 10 June 2012 against traditional rivals Mackay Cutters. From Round 1 2012 the Pride began live streaming their home games free to members via their website ($5 for non-members). From Round 5 2012 away games were streamed through the website as well ($5).
 1: Northern Pride lost 22–24 : Round 6, Saturday 14 April 2012 against Tweed Heads Seagulls from Piggabeen Sports Complex, Tweed Heads
 2: Northern Pride lost 14–38 : Round 12, Saturday 2 June 2012 against Ipswich Jets from North Ipswich Reserve, Ipswich
 3: Northern Pride won 36–10 : Round 13, Sunday 10 June 2012 against Mackay Cutters from Barlow Park, Cairns

References

External links
 Northern Pride Official site
 Northern Pride Facebook Page
 Northern Pride Twitter Page
 Northern Pride YouTube Page
 2012 Northern Pride match highlights on YouTube

Northern Pride RLFC seasons
2012 in Australian rugby league
2012 in rugby league by club